Walk Away Renée/Pretty Ballerina is the debut studio album by the American baroque pop band the Left Banke, released in January 1967. Named after its two hit singles, "Walk Away Renée" and "Pretty Ballerina", it peaked at number 67 on the Billboard Albums chart.  Although the album was not widely popular upon its initial release, and fell into relative obscurity for a time, it is now viewed as a definitive example of baroque pop music.

The album spent eleven weeks on the Billboard 200, peaking at number 67. After its initial release, the album remained out of print for decades. It was, however, available in its entirety on the 1992 compilation There's Gonna Be a Storm: The Complete Recordings 1966–1969.  On June 28, 2011, Walk Away Renée/Pretty Ballerina was reissued on Sundazed Records, remastered by Bob Irwin.

Background
During 1966, the Left Banke released the singles "Walk Away Renée" and "Pretty Ballerina", which peaked at number 5 and number 15 respectively on the Billboard Hot 100. Written by keyboardist Michael Brown, the son of producer and jazz violinist Harry Lookofsky, both singles and their B-sides were incorporated into the album.

Early recording sessions for Walk Away Renée/Pretty Ballerina started in December 1965 in the small World United Studio at 48th and Broadway in Manhattan, with sessions for the singles taking place in March and then November 1966.  The remaining album sessions took place in January 1967 at Mercury Studios in New York. During the course of 1966, Michael Brown's father and the band's manager/producer, Harry Lookofsky, fired both original drummer Warren David-Schierhorst and guitarist Jeff Winfield, replacing them with George Cameron and Rick Brand.

Most tracks on the album featured lead singer Steve Martin Caro, with harmony vocals by bassist Tom Finn and drummer Cameron; most tracks are also augmented by session musicians, with keyboardist Brown being the only band instrumentalist to appear on every song. However, the band itself does play on the tracks "Let Go of You Girl" and "Lazy Day". "What Do You Know", featuring lead vocals by Brown, is an early example of country rock, contemporary to similar efforts by the Byrds, the International Submarine Band, and Buffalo Springfield.

Critical reception

Mark Deming of AllMusic rated Walk Away Renée/Pretty Ballerina four-and-a-half stars out of five. He praised the album's diverse sound and noted that the record had marked the Left Banke for some time as "one of the best and most innovative American bands in rock & roll."

Track listing

Personnel
The Left Banke
 Steve Martin Caro — lead vocals
 Michael Brown — piano, harpsichord, clavinet; lead vocals (on "What Do You Know")
 Tom Finn — bass guitar, backing vocals
 George Cameron — drums, percussion, backing vocals; co-lead vocals on "I Haven't Got The Nerve"
 Warren David-Schierhorst — drums
 Jeff Winfield — electric guitar
 Rick Brand — electric guitar

Additional personnel
 Hugh McCracken — guitar
 Al Gorgoni — guitar
 George "Fluffer" Hirsh — guitar
 John Abbott — bass, guitar, string arrangements
 Seymour Barab — bass, cello
 Joe Mack — bass
 Al Rogers — drums
 Buddy Saltzman — drums
 Harry Lookofsky — violin
 George Marge — oboe
 Jackie Kelso - flute (uncredited)

Chart positions
Album

Singles

References

External links
LeftBanke.nu
DJ Tom Finn

1967 debut albums
The Left Banke albums
Smash Records albums